Arimathea or Harimathaea (Harimathaía) was a city of Judea. It was the reported home of Joseph of Arimathea, who appears in all four Gospel accounts of the Passion for having donated his new tomb outside Jerusalem to receive the body of Jesus.

Identification

Roman era
The historian Eusebius of Caesarea, in his Onomasticon (144:28-29), identified it with Ramathaim-Zophim and wrote that it was near Diospolis (now Lod). Ramathaim-Zophim was a town in Ephraim, the birthplace of Samuel, where David came to him (First Book of Samuel). He briefly describes it as follows:

Armthem Seipha (Sofim). City of Elcana and Samuel. It is situated (in the region of Thamna) near
Diospolis. The home of Joseph who was from Arimathea in the Gospels.

Scholars of the Onomasticon have identified the Greek Arimathea as deriving from the ancient Hebrew place name transliterated into Greek, as the older Hebrew place name "Ramathaim Sophim" attested in the Hebrew Bible (in addition to 1 Maccabees 11:34) was rendered into Greek in the ancient Septuagint as Armathaim Sipha.

Byzantine era
The town of Arimathea or Armathema (Harmathemē) appears on the 6th-century Madaba Map. Casanowicz argues for its identification with Beit Rima, now Bani Zeid in the West Bank.

Crusader period
The Crusaders seem to have identified Ramla, a medieval town founded around 705–715 by the Umayyads on land in what had once been the allotment of Dan, with both Ramathaim and Arimathea.

References

New Testament places
Lost ancient cities and towns
Joseph of Arimathea